This is a list of cathedrals in Bosnia and Herzegovina, sorted by denomination.

Eastern Orthodox
Cathedrals of the Serbian Orthodox Church:
 Nativity of the Theotokos Cathedral in Sarajevo
 Cathedral of Christ the Saviour in Banja Luka
 Cathedral of Holy Transfiguration in Trebinje
 Cathedral Church of the Holy Trinity in Mostar
 Cathedral Church of the Ascension in Nevesinje
 Cathedral of the Holy Apostles Peter and Paul in Bosanski Petrovac
 Co-Cathedral of the Descent of the Holy Spirit on the Apostles in Bihać
 Co-Cathedral of Birth of St. John the Baptist in Šipovo

Roman Catholic Church
Cathedrals of the Roman Catholic Church in Bosnia and Herzegovina:

See also
Lists of cathedrals by country
Orthodoxy in Bosnia and Herzegovina

References

Cathedrals in Bosnia and Herzegovina
Bosnia and Herzegovina
Cathedrals
Cathedrals